Dean Evenson is a new-age musician, composer, producer and videographer. His hometown is Staten Island, New York. He has a master's degree in Molecular Biology. He worked in Manhattan as a recording engineer for Regent Sound with many Atlantic recording artists including Eric Clapton, Mose Allison, Roberta Flack. Dean plays several instruments including the Western concert flute, Native American flute, synthesizer, and keyboards. In the New Age genre, his music is generally sounds of nature combined with flute melodies and other instruments for ambient and meditative purposes. His music is often used for massage, meditation, yoga and relaxation.

In 1970, he and his wife Dudley Evenson became involved in the portable-video movement. They worked under grants from the New York State Council on the Arts with Raindance Foundation and helped publish a magazine called Radical Software. During the '70s, the Evensons traveled the country in a half-sized converted school bus documenting the emerging new age consciousness. They produced hundreds of hours of half-inch black and white video. They continue to produce videos and are in the process of archiving their extensive collection of early videos and high resolution videos, many of which can be viewed on their Soundings of the Planet YouTube Channel.

In 1979, Dean and Dudley Evenson founded the independent record company Soundings of the Planet in Tucson, Arizona. Over the years he has collaborated with many world class artists as a producer and musician, including Li Xiangting, master of the guqin (Chinese 7-string zither), Sergey Kuryokhin, Russian avant-garde composer and Native American elder Cha-das-ska-dum. The Dalai Lama even appears on one of his albums. He has also collaborated with Hungarian pianist Tom Barabas, trance guitarist Scott Huckabay, harpist d'Rachael, and Tim Alexander, innovative drummer from the rock group Primus (band). He lives with his wife, Dudley, in the Pacific Northwest by a wild river in the foothills of the Cascade Mountains. They have three children and one granddaughter.

Soundings of the Planet has two YouTube channels. Soundings of the Planet YouTube that focuses on music and nature videos and Soundings Mindful Media YouTube that focuses on archival videos dating back to 1970 and more recent documentaries and spoken-word videos. They also produce the award-winning Soundings Podcast with interviews of thought leaders that can be heard on iTunes and Spotify or on their website soundings.com.

Partial discography, DVDs, Book 
 Soundings Tapestry – 1986 (Soundings Ensemble compilation)
 Joy To The World – 1986 (with d'Rachael)
 Peaceful Pond – 1986 (with d'Rachael)
 Soaring – 1987 (with Tom Barabas)
 Echoes of the Night –  1987 (with Tsonakwa)
 Music Makes the Snow Melt Down – 1988 (with Soviet musicians)
 What Child Is This – 1988 (with Singh Kaur, d'Rachael)
 Ocean Dreams – 1989
 Instruments Of Peace – 1989 (with Singh Kaur, Tom Barabas, Don Reeve)
 Desert Moon Song – 1991 (with Dudley Evenson) 
 Wind Dancer – 1992 (with Tom Barabas)
 Forest Rain – 1994 
 Ascension – 1995 (with Dudley Evenson)
 Dreamstreams – 1996 
 Arctic Refuge: A Gathering of Tribes – 1996 (with Native American musicians)
 Reflections: Gentle Music for Loving – 1996 (Soundings Ensemble compilation)
 Prayer: A Multi-cultural Journey of Spirit – 1998 (Various artists compilation)
 Sound Healing – 1998 (Soundings Ensemble compilation)
 Healing Waters – 1999
 Peace Through Music 20th Anniversary Sampler – 1999 (Soundings Ensemble compilation)
 Tao of Healing – 2000 (with Li Xiangting)
 Sonic Tribe –  2000 (with Scott Huckabay, Gina Sala)
 Native Healing – 2001 (with Cha-das-ska-dum)
 Music for the Healing Arts – 2001 (Soundings Ensemble compilation)
 Healing Dreams – 2001 (with Scott Huckabay)
 Ascension to Tibet –  2001 (with Dudley Evenson)
 Healing Sanctuary – 2002
 Sound Massage – 2002 (Soundings Ensemble compilation)
 Tao of Peace – 2002 (with LI Xiangting)
 Spirit Rising (Sonic Tribe) – 2002 (with Scott Huckabay, Gina Sala, Beth Quist) Sound Yoga – 2003 (Soundings Ensemble compilation) Mountain Meadow Meditation – 2003 (with Scott Huckabay) A Gift For Mother – 2003 (with Tom Barabas) Raga Cycle – 2004 (with 'Pandit Shivnath Mishra, Deobrat Mishra) Sacred World Chants – 2004 (Various artists compilation) Eagle River – 2005 Eagle River (DVD) 2006  Spa Rhythms – 2006 (with SoulFood) Golden Spa Tones -2006 (with Walter Makichen) Spa Dreams – 2007 (with d'Rachael) Wood Over Water − 2007 Healing The Holy Land – 2007 (Various artists compilation) Soundings Global Rhythms Collection –  2008 (Soundings Ensemble compilation) Chakra Healing – 2008 (with Soundings Ensemble) Meditation Moment: 52 Weekly Affirmations –  2008 (with Dudley Evenson) Healing Suite – 2009 (with Tom Barabas) Meditation Moods –  2010 (with Dudley Evenson) Meditation Moods DVD –  2010 (with Dudley Evenson) Sacred Earth –  2010 Reiki Om – 2011 (with Henry Han) A Sound Sleep: Guided Meditations With Relaxing Music & Nature Sounds – 2011 (with Dudley Evenson) A Year of Guided Meditations (DVD) –  2012 (with Dudley Evenson) 2 U.N. Earth Summits (1972 & 1992) (DVD) –  2012 (with Dudley Evenson) Relaxation Zone – 2012 4 Earth: Natural Sounds of Ocean, Stream, River, Pond –  2013 4 Earth: Scenic Vistas of Ocean, Stream, River, Pond (DVD) – 2013 Dream Space – 2013 Chakra Meditations & Tones – 2014 (with Dudley Evenson, Beth Quist) Harmonic Way –  2014 (with Scott Huckabay) Sonic Healing Meet the Masters Video Course (DVD) –  2015 (with Dudley Evenson) Desert Dawn Song –  2015 (original 1979 cassette) (with Dudley Evenson) Golden Spiral –  2016 (with Scott Huckabay) Stillness – 2016 Amber Sky – 2017 (with Phil Heaven & Jeff Willson) Quieting the Monkey Mind: How to Meditate with Music (BOOK) – 2018 (with Dudley Evenson) Prayers on the Wind: Native American & Silver Flutes – 2018 (with Peter Ali) Net of Indra – 2018 (with Tim Alexander) Peace Through Music 40th Anniversary Collection – 2019 (with Soundings Ensemble) Tropical Relaxation – 2019 (with d'Rachael) Healing Resonance – 2020 (with Scott Huckabay, Phil Heaven)In 1969, Evenson played flute for the psychedelic rock group The Blues Magoos on their Never Goin' Back to Georgia'' album.

See also 
List of ambient music artists

External links 
 Soundings of the Planet Web Site
 Soundings of the Planet Facebook
 Soundings of the Planet YouTube
 Soundings Mindful Media YouTube
 Dean Evenson Instagram
 Seattle Weekly article

Evenson, Dean
Ambient musicians
Electronic musicians
1944 births
Living people